Sunshine Grammar School is a British curriculum school located in Chittagong, Bangladesh. The school provides lessons in Edexcel and Cambridge International Examinations for IGCSE and A Levels.

History
Sunshine Grammar School was established in 1985. It was the first British Curriculum School in the port city of Chittagong, Bangladesh, offering IGCSE, Ordinary and Advanced Levels education under Britain's CIE and Pearsons Edexcel,UK.

The first batch of Sunshiners appeared for exams in 1987. Sunshine was one of the first Schools in Bangladesh to be allocated an 'examination centre' status in the country by a British Education Board.

Sunshine Grammar School is an international test centre for SAT examinations (Center Code # 74108). The school has also achieved recognition from Universities and Colleges Admissions Service (UCAS) as an international school and is closed centre for exams conducted by Admissions Testing Services (ATS) for entrance into undergraduate degrees in Cambridge and Oxford University.

Subsidiaries

Chittagong Sunshine College, established in 1995, is the oldest English-medium National Curriculum based college under the Chittagong Education Board, Bangladesh.

Chittagong Sunshine School & College, is a leading English-medium National Curriculum based school established in 2005 with a 100% pass rate.

Little Steps Dhaka is the first foray of Sunshine Education outside of Chittagong. Little Steps specialises in day care and pre-play for toddlers and plans to start a kindergarten section in the near future.

Admissions
The mode of admission is selective. Admissions are based on a preliminary written exam that tests English, maths and the sciences. Following satisfactory performance in the written test, the applicant undergoes a formal interview with the school authorities, who then make a final decision to offer a place to the student based on his/her academic, extracurricular and social skills.  Approximately 15% of pupils are awarded a scholarship for excellence in academics and/or extracurricular activities.

Facilities
 Auditorium and Theater Hall, which seats over 300 students
 Art Gallery
 Campus fully under Wi-Fi coverage with the objective of encouraging digital learning
 Air-Conditioners in all classrooms
 Projectors in senior section classrooms
 Interactive room for kids
 Bookstore
 Internationally accredited Computer Lab with over 25 PCs 
 Indoor Sports Room consisting of Table Tennis, Chess, Darts, Carom and Foosball
 Karate Lessons
 Fully equipped Science Laboratory approved by The British Council to conduct Practical Examinations for A Levels (Official Examination Centre)
 University Counseling by full-time specialist
 Dedicated School Psychologist/Psychiatrist trained in Child & Adolescent Mental Health from the United Kingdom
 Member of DISA sporting events with active participation in sporting tournaments in Dhaka.

Activities
 Annual Programs such Award-giving ceremonies, Pohela Boishakh etc.
 Art Competitions
 Community Service
 Debate Club (competes in both National and Regional Championships)
 Spelling Bee (Active participants of Spelling Bee Tournament organised by The Daily Star News)
 Earth Club and environmental conservatism
 Sunshine Charities
 Free Friday Clinic
 Annual Inter-School (Athletics, Cricket, Football, Indoor Sports and so on)
 Karate Club
 Industrial Tours
 Business & Science Fair

Academic subjects

SGS offers the most comprehensive list of subjects offered by a Bangladeshi school for IGCSE, Ordinary and Advanced Level examinations from CIE & Pearsons Edexcel. The subjects are as follows:
 Accounting
 Applied Information and Communication Technology
 Art & Design
 Bangladesh Studies
 Bengali
 Biology
 Business Studies
 Chemistry
 Commerce
 Economics
 English Language
 English as a Second Language
 English Literature
 Geography
 Hindi
 Human Biology
 Information Technology (I.T.)
 Islamic Studies
 Mathematics A
 Mathematics B
 Mathematics D
 Additional Mathematics
 Pure Mathematics
 Physics
 Psychology
 Religious Studies
 Statistics
 Urdu

Notable alumni
 Tamim Iqbal Khan - Captain of the Bangladesh National Cricket Team
 Irfan Sukkur - Member of Bangladesh A Cricket Team 
 Nafees Iqbal - Bangladesh Cricket Team

References

External links
 Website

Schools in Chittagong District
Cambridge schools in Bangladesh
Educational institutions established in 1985
1985 establishments in Bangladesh